This is a list of the constituencies in the Azad Kashmir Legislative Assembly.

List of Constituency

See also 
 List of constituencies of Pakistan

A
Legislative Assembly constituencies
Pakistan politics-related lists
Legislative Assembly constituencies
Azad Kashmir Legislative Assembly constituencies